WTBS may refer to:

 WTBS-LD, a low-power television station (channel 6) licensed to Atlanta, Georgia, U.S.
 WPCH-TV, a television station (channel 17 analog/20 digital) licensed to Atlanta, Georgia, U.S., which used the call sign WTBS from 1979 to 2007
 TBS (U.S. TV channel), a nationwide cable channel spun off from WTBS
 WMBR, an M.I.T. student radio station (88.1 FM) in Cambridge, Massachusetts, U.S., which used the call sign WTBS from 1961 to 1979
 The British Broadcasting Corporation Wartime Broadcasting Service

Legal entities of Jehovah's Witnesses
 Watch Tower Bible and Tract Society of Pennsylvania, the main corporation for worldwide activities of Jehovah's Witnesses
 Watchtower Bible and Tract Society of New York, the corporation for administrative functions of Jehovah's Witnesses within the U.S.